Mathematical Social Sciences is a peer-reviewed mathematics journal in the field of social science, in particular economics. The journal covers research on mathematical modelling in fields such as economics, psychology, political science, and other social sciences, including individual decision making and preferences, decisions under risk, collective choice, voting, theories of measurement, and game theory.

It was established in 1980 and is published by Elsevier. The editors-in-chief have been Ki Hang Kim (1980-1983), Hervé Moulin (1983-2004), Jean-François Laslier (2005-2016), Simon Grant, Christopher Chambers (2009-2020), Yusufcan Masatlioglu (2020-2021), Juan Moreno-Ternero (2017-) and Emel Filiz-Ozbay (2021-).

See also 
 List of scholarly journals in economics

External links 
 

Economics journals
Elsevier academic journals
Publications established in 1980
English-language journals
Bimonthly journals
Mathematics journals
Multidisciplinary social science journals